Polci (Pəlci, Posə) is an Afro-Asiatic language of Bauchi State, Nigeria. It is part of the Barawa cluster, which is in turn part of the West Chadic language family.

Dialects
The Polci language is one of six dialect clusters of the Zaar subgroup of the Barawa branch of the Chadic languages.  The Polci dialects are Zul, Baram (Mbaram), Dir, Buli, Nyamzak/Langas, and Polci proper.

An extinct dialect called Luri was possibly dialect of Polci as well, but it is not well attested.

History of scholarship
There have been several attempts to clarify the linguistic situation in the southern and southwestern part of Bauchi State, Nigeria, of which the Polci cluster and Polci language are a part.

In 1971, John Ballard, working with the Department of Linguistics and Nigerian Languages, University of Ibadan, did an extensive linguistic survey of the Nigerian Middle Belt published Historical inferences from the linguistic geography of the Nigerian Middle Belt. As a result, it came to light that there was a narrow corridor occupied by the speakers of Chadic languages in the southwest of Bauchi.

In the same year, Neil Campbell and James Hoskison from the Summer Institute of Linguistics carried out a linguistic survey of the Bauchi area. The survey, Bauchi Area Survey Report and published in 1972, listed the names, location and population of twenty four Chadic languages, which are very closely related to each other and are spoken to the south and west of Bauchi. They also collected word lists. However, no detailed analysis of linguistic data or language classification was included in either of these surveys.

Also in 1971, C. Hoffman published Provisional Check List of Chadic Languages, which contained 17 languages divided into two sub-groups. This list was revised and amplified by Kay Williamson in a document handed out to students at the University of Ibadan, titled Chadic languages of Nigeria in 1972, to include 21 languages classified into three subgroups.

With this information, K. Shimizu set out in 1974 to list the languages belonging to the Southern Bauchi Group, to examine their geographical distribution, and to use valid linguistic data to come up with sub-classifications. The survey, published in 1978 and titled A survey report of The South Bauchi Group of Chadic Languages came to the conclusion that not all languages listed under the dialect continuum of the South Bauchi Group belonged there and came up with a much more extensive, new classification. This is also the work from which the Barawa subgroup name came from, which was found to be the term used locally in this area to denote the speakers of this dialect continuum. Much of the research done on Barawa languages, the Polci cluster, and Polci itself use this survey as an important reference.

In 1999, Ronald Cosper published Barawa lexicon: A wordlist of eight South Bauchi (West Chadic) languages: Boghom, Buli, Dott, Geji, Jimi, Polci, Sayanci and Zul. It considered most of the languages to be endangered and found that most individuals who spoke any of these languages were also bilingual in Hausa, which may have had influence on their lexicons and grammars. The book contains a lexicon of 852 words from the different Barawa languages. The words are organized based on semantic and syntactic categories. Semantic noun categories are followed by adjectives, numerals, pronouns, prepositions, conjunctions and a number of categories of verbs.  However, Cosper's work was seriously defective.

Since then, the majority of the research on South Bauchi West (B.3) languages has been conducted by Bernard Caron, a faculty member at the French National Centre for Scientific Research, LLACAN. Caron's research has focused on South Bauchi West and Polci cluster languages in particular. Many of his papers are available online and include topics such as linguistic classification, syntactic structures such as conditionals, and noun classes such as pronominal and number systems.

Phonology

Consonants

Polci contains 35 consonant phonemes.

Vowels

Polci contains six vowels qualities, which can be pronounced as short or long.

Short vowels: 

Long vowels:

Tones
Polci is a three-tone language: Lo = à; Mid = a; Hi = á.

Nouns

Plurality
Polci, being a South Bauchi West language, does not possess grammatical gender or nominal classes and as a rule, few nouns form a plural (morpho-lexical plural). The plural inside the NP (noun phrase) is expressed through the noun modifiers. There is no agreement between the verb and its arguments. However, plurality appears in the verb phrase in two places: (i) the formation of the imperatives (ii) a verbal derivation forming what has come to be called pluractionals.

Pronouns

Numbers
Polci has a decimal numeral system.

Syntax

Conditionals
Conditionals generally are assumed to share their structure with topics. However, in Chadic South Bauchi West languages, such as Polci, conditionals share their structure with focus, not topic. In Polci specifically, focused constituents and conditional clauses appear on the left periphery marked by the identifying copula  'it is'. ].

References

Further reading
 Caron, B. 2003: Barawa: The pronominal system of South-Bauchi West Chadic languages. Paper presented at CIL 17, Prague.
 Caron, B. 2009: Documenting linguistic varieties of the South-Bauchi group. Towards polylectal grammars of African languages. Hamburg, Germany.
 Cosper, R. & Gital, G. 2004: Genitive Constructions in South Bauchi (West Chadic) Languages, Zul and Polchi, with Comparisons to Ancient Egyptian. Egyptian and Semito-Hamitic (Afro-Asiatic) studies: In memoriam W. Vycichl. Leiden: Brill.

External links
 Bernard Caron at Academia.edu
 Polci at the Endangered Languages Project
 Words of Life – Bible Stories in Polci at the Global Recordings Network
 Polci dictionary

Chadic languages
Languages of Nigeria
Endangered Afroasiatic languages
Languages with ISO 639-3 code